Ana Flávia Magalhães Pinto (born 1979) is a Brazilian historian and academic at the University of Brasília, where she is the only black female professor in the history department.

Life
Ana Flávia Magalhães Pinto' received her BA in journalism from the University Center of Brasília, her MA in history from the University of Brasília and her PhD in history from the State University of Campinas.

Works
 (ed. with Maria Lúcia de Santana Braga and Sales Augusto dos Santos) Ações afirmativas e combate ao racismo nas Américas. Brasília: Unesco, 2005.
 (ed. with Maria Lúcia de Santana Braga and Edileuza Penha de Souza) Dimensões da inclusão no ensino médio : mercado de trabalho, religiosidade e educação quilombola. Brasilia: Ministerio da Educacao, 2006
 Imprensa negra no Brasil do século XIX. São Paulo: Selo Negro, 2010.
 (ed. with Sidney Chalhoub) Pensadores negros – pensadoras negras, Brasil, séculos XIX e XX. Rio de Janeiro: Editora Fino Traço, 2016.
 Escritos de liberdade : literatos negros, racismo e cidadania no Brasil oitocentista. Campinas, SP, Brasil: Editora Unicamp, 2018.

References

External links
 Ana Flávia Magalhães Pinto, womenalsoknowhistory.com

1979 births
Living people
21st-century Brazilian historians
Academic staff of the University of Brasília